Barakatullah Kadada (born 8 August 2001) is an Afghan cricketer. He made his first-class debut for Mis Ainak Region in the 2017–18 Ahmad Shah Abdali 4-day Tournament on 29 April 2018.

References

External links
 

2001 births
Living people
Afghan cricketers
Mis Ainak Knights cricketers
Place of birth missing (living people)